Botswana made its Paralympic Games début at the 2004 Summer Paralympics in Athens. The country sent a single representative (Tshotlego Morama) to compete in athletics.  She set a world record and won a gold medal in the T46 women's 400m.

Team 
Botswana made their Paralympic debut in Athens. The country sent a single representative, Tshotlego Morama, to compete in athletics.

Athletics
Morama entered only the 400m sprint event, in the T46 category. She finished first of her heat, and, with a time of 57.09, was the only athlete to run under one minute in the heats. She ran the final in 55.99 seconds, setting a new world record to take gold.
Women

See also
Botswana at the Paralympics
Botswana at the 2004 Summer Olympics

References

External links
International Paralympic Committee

Nations at the 2004 Summer Paralympics
2004
Paralympics